A Scream in the Night is a 1934 American film directed by Fred C. Newmeyer and starring Lon Chaney Jr. It is distinct from the 1919 silent film of the same name, co-directed by Leander de Cordova and Burton L. King, and starring Ruth Budd and Ralph Kellard.

Plot
A colonial police detective (Chaney Jr.) in an Eastern seaport seeks a stolen gem, and infiltrates the underworld by posing as a drunken, look-alike wharfside bar owner.

Cast
Lon Chaney Jr. as Detective Jack Wilson / Butch Curtain
Sheila Terry as Edith Bentley
Zarah Tazil as Mora
Philip Ahn (credited as Philip Ann) as Wu Ting
John Ince as Joe Bentley
Manuel López as Johnny Fly
Richard Cramer as Inspector Green
Merrill McCormick as Jalla, the Money-Lender
John Lester Johnson as John, the Bartender

External links

American crime thriller films
American black-and-white films
Films directed by Fred C. Newmeyer
Commodore Pictures films
1930s crime thriller films
1930s English-language films
1930s American films